Dublin Rising 1916-2016 is a website launched by Google to celebrate the 100th anniversary of the Easter Rising in Dublin, Ireland. The website tours the streets of Dublin, while allowing the user to interact with statements and photographs. It is narrated by Colin Farrell while guiding the user to various important buildings and events in the rising of the Irish republic.

Launched on 12 January 2016 by Taoiseach Enda Kenny and Minister for Arts, Heritage and the Gaeltacht Heather Humphreys, the goal of website is to educate people on how Ireland fought for independence.

References

History websites of Ireland
Internet properties established in 2016